Agdistis potgieteri is a moth in the family Pterophoridae. It is known from South Africa (Free State, Limpopo, and Western and Northern Cape).

The wingspan is 27–32 mm. The forewings are grey with four dark dots, two in the discal area and at the costal margin. The other two are found in the middle part and on the base of the wing. The hindwings are uniformly grey. Adults are on wing from the end of August to January.

Etymology
The species is named after its collector J.H. Potgieter.

References

Endemic moths of South Africa
Agdistinae
Moths of Africa
Moths described in 2009